The Wales Act 1978 was an Act of the Parliament of the United Kingdom intended to introduce a limited measure of self-government in Wales through the creation of a Welsh Assembly. The act never took effect as a result of the "no" vote in 1979 Welsh devolution referendum and was repealed in 1979.

Welsh Assembly proposed by the Act

Had the Wales Act 1978 entered force, it would have created a Welsh Assembly without primary legislative or tax raising powers. The proposed assembly would have had 72 members elected by the first past the post system with each Westminster constituency returning either two or three assembly members. It would have met at the Coal Exchange in Cardiff.

It was planned that assembly would have operated under the committee system where subject committees would be formed with representation of all groups in the assembly. An Executive Committee would have been formed composed of the chairs of the various subject committees and other members selected by the assembly. A Chairman of the Executive Committee would have been selected who would also be Leader of the Assembly.

Powers

The assembly would have had the ability to pass secondary legislation with responsibility for primary legislation remaining with the UK Parliament at Westminster. It would have taken over the powers and functions of the Secretary of State for Wales.

The proposed assembly would have had responsibility for:
housing
health
education
planning
management of the Welsh Development Agency
appointments to Welsh quangos
it would be able to aid the development of:
Welsh language
museums and galleries
libraries 
arts and crafts
sport
culture
recreation

Referendum

The provisions of the Act were put to the populace in 1979 in a referendum held on 1 March 1979 through the question:

'Do you want the provisions of the Wales Act 1978 to be put into effect?'

The results of the referendum were:

Repeal

As a result of the negative referendum outcome, the Act never took effect, and was repealed in accordance with the Act's own provisions by the Wales Act 1978 (Repeal) Order 1979.

References

External links
Wales Act 1979

Government of Wales
United Kingdom Acts of Parliament 1978
Constitutional laws of Wales
Acts of the Parliament of the United Kingdom concerning Wales
Repealed United Kingdom Acts of Parliament
20th century in Wales
1978 in Wales
Welsh devolution
Referendums in Wales